Pete Barbutti (born May 4, 1934) is an American comedian and musician. He made about 15 appearances on The Tonight Show Starring Johnny Carson, from 1971 through 1992. In the early 1980s Barbutti also hosted a short-lived variety show called Pete's Place.

Early life
Barbutti was born in Scranton, Pennsylvania.

Career
Barbutti is known for often incorporating his musicianship into his comedy routines. He plays piano, accordion, and trumpet.

Among his better-known routines are "Cordeen School,"  about an accordion teacher who sells a lot of accordions, but whose students never seem to learn much, "The Mustang Ranch," about legalized prostitution in Nevada, and a number of piano-based gags (such as "tuning the piano stool," and using the business-end of a plumber's helper, stuck to the side of the piano, as a cigar holder). Among his better known jokes is the story of the pig with the wooden leg.

Among his better known television works are "Celebrity Microwaves" as the host, and The New Liars Club and The Next Line as a regular panelist. He performed on many talk show/variety shows in the late 1960s through 1980s, including The Alan Thicke Show, The Alan Hamel Show, The Mike Douglas Show, The Merv Griffin Show, The Joey Bishop Show, Dinah!, The John Davidson Show, and The Steve Allen Playhouse. In 1985, guest starred on season 6 episode 17 "solid gold" of Benson playing Pete (a card dealer)

Notes

External links

Interview with Pete Barbutti on Talktails, January 2012, VegasVideoNetwork.com
An extensive interview with Pete Barbutti, Part One, Part Two, September 2011, Classic Showbiz blog

1934 births
Living people
American male comedians
21st-century American comedians
People from Scranton, Pennsylvania
Comedians from Pennsylvania